Warad-Sin (ARAD-Dsuen) ruled the ancient Near East city-state of Larsa from 1770 BC to 1758 BC (short chronology). There are indications that his father Kudur-Mabuk was co-regent or at very least the power behind the throne. His sister En-ane-du was high priestess of the moon god in Ur.

Annals survive for his complete 12-year reign.  He recorded that in his second year as king, he destroyed the walls of Kazallu, and defeated the army of Mutibal that had occupied Larsa.

He was succeeded as king of Larsa by his brother Rim-Sin I.

Gallery

See also

Chronology of the ancient Near East
Kings of Larsa

Notes

External links
Warad-Sin Year Names at CDLI

Amorite kings
18th-century BC Sumerian kings
Kings of Larsa
18th-century BC people